Mathew William Kearney (born December 1, 1978) is an American musician born in Eugene, Oregon, and based in Nashville, Tennessee. So far, he has a total of five top 20 hits on the Adult Top 40 Chart.

Just Kids was released on February 24, 2015. The album's first single, "Heartbeat", was released on November 4, 2014. Crazytalk was released on May 4, 2018.

Biography

Early life
Kearney was born on December 1, 1978 and raised in Eugene, Oregon, with his two brothers. At South Eugene High School, Kearney was a soccer player.

He attended California State University, Chico in Chico, California, on an athletic scholarship and majored in literature, playing soccer until his junior year. Kearney first became interested in music after traveling to Nashville with music producer Robert Marvin. Using a roommate's guitar, he tried covering songs by other artists, but realized he was not very good at it, and began writing his own. Though things were going well for Kearney at school, the partying atmosphere at Chico caught up to him. In an interview, Kearney said, "I guess I lived it up and did what everyone said you should do in college. I discovered the depth of depravity, the bleakness of that lifestyle. It just wasn't working. I finally started understanding there must be more to life."

Kearney began focusing on music fusing his simple guitar playing with spoken word or rap. He started to play at coffee shops and soon began to make small amounts of money. At this time, Kearney had met friend and future producer, Robert Marvin. The two began to make music together, but Marvin had plans to move to Nashville, Tennessee. Marvin asked Kearney to help with the move and he accepted. Kearney says, "I helped him pack up his trailer and we put a mattress on the back of his truck. We basically drove cross-country and slept in the back. When we pulled into Nashville we slept in a school parking lot for three days until we finally rented this apartment where the roof was caving in and mice were crawling all over." Kearney decided to stay in Nashville to record a few demos with Marvin and after a few months, Kearney had no plans on returning. "By the end of the summer, we had three or four songs and I realized this is what I wanted to do. It just clicked. So I called home to Oregon and said, 'I'm not coming back' and I never left Nashville."

Recording career 
On April 18, 2006, Kearney's second album and major-label debut, titled Nothing Left to Lose, was released. It contains several reworked songs from Kearney's first album Bullet, as well as some new material, and has sold over 450,000 copies to date. The title track "Nothing Left to Lose" was the first single from the album, peaking at No. 41 on the Billboard Hot 100 for the week of February 10, 2007. The single has sold over 500,000 copies and won numerous BMI awards. The track "All I Need" was featured on Grey's Anatomy and NCIS. It peaked at No. 94 on the Billboard Pop 100. To promote Nothing Left to Lose, Kearney toured with John Mayer, Sheryl Crow, Train, Mutemath, Meiko, and Cary Brothers throughout 2005, '06, and '07; he also headlined VH1's first ever "You Oughta Know Tour" in early 2007.

Kearney's following album, City of Black & White, was released through Columbia Records on May 19, 2009. He collaborated with Nashville artists such as Trent Dabbs, Matthew Perryman Jones, Kate York, Paul Moak, Daniel James, Will Sayles, and Josiah Bell. Robert Marvin (tobyMac, Britt Nicole), the producer of Kearney's previous albums and EPs, joined him yet again. The lead single was "Closer To Love", and it received much airplay, on both secular and Christian outlets. His second single is "All I Have", the last song he wrote before releasing the album.

In May 2009, Kearney toured with Keane and The Helio Sequence for several weeks to promote City of Black & White. It debuted on the Billboard 200 at No. 13. He toured with Owl City and Unwed Sailor on Owl City's "All Things Bright and Beautiful Tour".

Young Love was released August 2, 2011. The album's first single, "Hey Mama", was released on May 10, 2011. "Hey Mama" charted in the Top 40 of Adult Pop Songs at No. 22. The second single "Down" charted as high as No. 23 on the Christian Songs chart. Just Kids, was released on February 24, 2015. The album's first single, "Heartbeat", was released on November 4, 2014. He toured with both Judah and the Lion and Parachute during his "Just Kids" tour in 2015.

From August 17, 2016 through November 12, 2016, Kearney toured with Needtobreathe for their second annual Tour de Compadres, where he performed songs from his albums Nothing Left to Lose, Young Love, and Just Kids.

On December 13, 2016, Kearney signed with independent music company Big Loud Mountain Management. On February 3, 2017, Kearney released a song with Filous, titled "Goodbye". Kearney released a self-titled EP on December 22, 2017, previewing new tracks from his forthcoming album, Crazy Talk.

Mat Kearney released his sixth album, Crazytalk, May 4, 2018 to average reviews. Kearney did a two-month long Crazytalk tour starting the third week of February 2018. The album's single, "Better Than I Used to be", released on November 10, 2017 and reached No. 27 on the Viral 50 chart.

To celebrate the ten year anniversary of his second album, The City of Black and White, Kearney released The City of Black and White Revisited EP in June 2019. He promoted the project with an acoustic concert tour beginning that Fall.

Band 

 Mat Kearney – vocals, guitar, piano
 Chad Kinner – drums, percussion (2011–present)
 Fred Williams – piano, keys
 Adam Keafer – bass (2010–2015)
 Nathan Spicer – guitar (2010–present)
 Tyler Burkum – guitar, vocals (2009–present)
 Phil Moore – bass (2015–present)
 M.D. Miller – bass (2005–2009)
 Jeremy Lutito – drums (2009–2012)
 Aaron Farmer – keys (2016)

Musical style
Kearney's music incorporates hip hop and folk-pop. A notable exception to this was on his third album The City of Black and White where the hip-hop element was downplayed with Kearney explaining that he was trying to make a "more mature, more adult contemporary" album with his next album though he would return to his normal mix of genres. He recalls that upon the release of his major label debut, "it got totally trashed by Rolling Stone because I was blending hip-hop stuff into my music." Inspired by his hero, Paul Simon, Kearney tries to make each of his albums have a distinct sound stating, "usually if I did one thing on one record, I tend to somewhat be the other extreme on the next one." The album Crazytalk notably features the inclusion of EDM into his music.

Personal life 
Kearney currently resides in Nashville, Tennessee with his wife Annie, whom he married in 2010.

Kearney has stated that his legal name is Mathew due to a nurse's error on his birth certificate. He discovered the error while in the 8th grade when he noticed how his mom corrected the error with ink, never legally correcting it. Since then, he embraced the one "T" in his legal name.

On January 4, 2017, Kearney and his wife had their first child, a girl named Olive Sims Kearney.  Their second daughter was born on March 25, 2020, and named Violet River Kearney.

Discography

Studio albums

Live albums

Extended plays

Live concerts
 Mat Kearney: Live at The Fillmore, San Francisco (2010)

Singles

Other appearances

Awards

GMA Dove Awards

Media appearances 

Kearney's songs have appeared on the following television series: 30 Rock, Awake, Dirty Sexy Money, Kyle XY, The Unit, Without a Trace, Laguna Beach, The Hills, Bones, Jericho, Friday Night Lights, Wildfire, What About Brian, South Beach, 8th & Ocean, One Tree Hill, Scrubs, The Closer, NCIS, Life Unexpected, Grey's Anatomy, Parenthood, So You Think You Can Dance, The Vampire Diaries and A to Z. His song "Runaway" is featured on the Soul Surfer movie soundtrack. Kearney's song "Sooner or Later" provides the background music to the WWDC 2013 and Google's Zeitgeist 2011: Year in Review video, which was uploaded to YouTube on December 14, 2011. He was also on The Today Show performing the song "Billion". In an interview with Entertainment Weekly, Ricky Gervais included Kearney on his "Must List", stating "This singer-songwriter does spoken word that sounds like French hip-hop."

Notes and references

External links
 
 
 Breakfast with the Arts on A&E (1992, TV Show)
 Featured Music on Grey's Anatomy
 Review of City of Black and White
 Kearney goes home
 Sims-Kearney vows planned in Tennessee

1978 births
Living people
21st-century American singers
21st-century American male singers
American male pop singers
American male singer-songwriters
American performers of Christian music
Musicians from Eugene, Oregon
People from Chico, California
Singer-songwriters from California
Singer-songwriters from Oregon
South Eugene High School alumni
California State University, Chico alumni
Inpop Records artists